Collinsville is a village and census-designated place (CDP) in the town of Canton, Hartford County, Connecticut, United States. The population was 3,746 at the 2010 census. The central portion of the village is a historic district listed on the National Register of Historic Places.

It was built around the Collins Company Axe Factory, a manufacturer of edge tools, such as axes, machetes, picks and knives. Collins machetes were the brand of choice in South America. Collins tools were used almost exclusively for the construction of the Trans-Siberian Railway, and axes and picks made their way across the country to be used in the California Gold Rush. Admiral Peary carried Collins tools to the North Pole.

Typical of New England mills, the Collins Company axe factory was sited on a river (the Farmington), and their production was powered by utilizing the water's strength to turn turbines and power machines. The numerous old buildings ramble along the riverbanks intertwined by an intricate maze of sluices that run throughout the site.  The company closed its doors in 1966, but the factory buildings stayed standing and are now rented out to local businesses. The ambiance of Main Street reflects period architecture with ornate details from the start of the 20th century.

History

According to historian Diana Muir writing in Reflections in Bullough's Pond, it was in Collinsville that Elisha Root invented the important industrial technique of die casting. Root was employed by Samuel W. Collins whose Collins and Company was the largest manufacturer of axes in the nineteenth century. Other famous historical residents of Collinsville included George Washington Flint and William E. Simonds.

Collinsville hosts an annual Halloween Parade through the historic town. The parade is held on the last Saturday of October at 7 p.m. Children's activities begin at 6 p.m.

Collinsville was voted one of the "Top 10 Coolest Small Towns in America" in the September 2007 issue of Arthur Frommer's Budget Travel magazine.

Geography

Demographics
As of the census of 2000, there were 2,686 people, 1,080 households, and 723 families residing in the CDP. The racial makeup of the CDP was 97.54% White, 0.56% African American, 0.07% Native American, 0.48% Asian, 0.30% from other races, and 1.04% from two or more races. Hispanic or Latino of any race were 1.60% of the population.

There were 1,080 households, out of which 32.8% had children under the age of 18 living with them, 51.9% were married couples living together, 11.3% had a female householder with no husband present, and 33.0% were non-families. 26.5% of all households were made up of individuals, and 5.2% had someone living alone who was 65 years of age or older.  The average household size was 2.40 and the average family size was 2.91.

In the CDP, the population was spread out, with 24.3% under the age of 18, 5.0% from 18 to 24, 31.9% from 25 to 44, 26.2% from 45 to 64, and 12.6% who were 65 years of age or older.  The median age was 39 years. For every 100 females, there were 91.4 males.  For every 100 females age 18 and over, there were 87.1 males.

The median income for a household in the CDP was $60,690, and the median income for a family was $66,550. Males had a median income of $44,414 versus $37,679 for females. The per capita income for the CDP was $29,050.  About 1.4% of families and 1.5% of the population were below the poverty line, including 2.3% of those under age 18 and none of those age 65 or over.

Sites

Collinsville is located directly on the Farmington River, and is a common place for people to walk and bike to, due to its convenient location along the Rails to Trails path. There are many cultural attractions in this town center, including LaSalle Restaurant, where customers are allowed to leave before paying, and return when they have finished eating, to pay. Frequently on Sundays and other occasions, there are live music demonstrations in the parking lot outside.

The Canton Historical Museum is located in a former Collins Company factory building built in 1865.  Originally constructed to finish and assemble agricultural plows, the building was converted in 1924 to a recreational facility for its employees.  Fred Widen, a pattern maker for the company, used a portion of the building for his large collection of Collins memorabilia.  Today, the Canton Historical Society owns the 14,000+ sq. ft. building and has a large assortment of Collins Tools, as well as many Victorian items, a general store, farm/agricultural equipment, children's toys, looms, and a Bridal Parlor featuring wedding dresses worn by Canton residents from the late 1800s.  Also of interest, are several Regina music boxes, a large pump fire engine, used by the Collins Company, an Edison phonograph and Edison fans.  Upstairs, the Farmington Valley Railroad Society operates a railroad diorama of the village of Collinsville around the start of the 20th century.

A research and genealogical library containing thousands of documents and photographs related to Canton and Collinsville history is also located upstairs, including black and white photos of the 1955 flood. Information about local cemeteries in Canton and Collinsville are available in the library. The museum covers three floors with limited handicap accessibility, but plans are underway to make the building more accessible in the future.

In the 19th century, a Collinsville butcher feuded with his neighbor. To spite his neighbor, the butcher built between their adjoining houses a narrow, two-story structure with windows covered by Venetian blinds. The wooden building located between 23 and 25 River Street was the width of a standard stairway and allowed the butcher to block the sun to the neighbor's home and block the neighbor's view of the butcher's property at will. The butcher's son got along with the family next door and eventually tore down the Collinsville Spite House.

On the Farmington Riverbank is a red lumber shed which used to belong to the Miner Lumber Co. Inc., which has since moved to a new location in Canton. It is currently occupied by Collinsville Canoe & Kayak.

See also

National Register of Historic Places listings in Hartford County, Connecticut

References

External links

Canton Historical Museum
Visit Collinsville

Canton, Connecticut
Census-designated places in Hartford County, Connecticut
Villages in Connecticut
Historic districts in Hartford County, Connecticut
Villages in Hartford County, Connecticut
Census-designated places in Connecticut
National Register of Historic Places in Hartford County, Connecticut
Historic districts on the National Register of Historic Places in Connecticut
Company towns in Connecticut